The Utah State Senate is the upper house of the Utah State Legislature, the state legislature of the U.S. state of Utah. The Utah Senate is composed of 29 elected members representing an equal number of senate districts. Each senate district is composed of approximately 95,000 people. Members of the Senate are elected to four-year terms without term limits. The Senate convenes at the Utah State Capitol in Salt Lake City.

The last elections were held in 2022.

Composition of the Senate

Leadership, 65th session

Members of the 65th Senate

↑: Senator was originally appointed

Legislative Website 
Utah Senate staff, under direction of Senate Presidents Waddoups and Niederhauser worked with the House of Representatives, the LFA, and other staff to develop what many have called the best legislative website in the nation.  In 2014, le.utah.gov won the NCSL Online Democracy Award.  The Utah Legislature had previously won this award in 2005.

Past composition of the Senate

See also
Utah House of Representatives
List of Utah State Legislatures
Utah Democratic Party
Utah Republican Party

References

External links
Utah State Senate
Project Vote Smart - State Senate of Utah
Utah Republican Party
Utah Democratic Party

Utah Legislature
State upper houses in the United States